Hiyanglam is a village situated within Kakching district, Manipur, India.
It has a population of about 8,872 people in 2011.

Demographics
Hiyanglam is neighbors with Wabagai in west, Langmeidong in South.

References

Villages in Kakching district